Gay Blade may refer to:

 Gay Blades, a 1946 American comedy film directed by George Blair
 Zorro, The Gay Blade, a comedy film from 1981
 The Washington Blade, an LGBT newspaper published in Washington, DC
 The Gaye Blades, a Black Lips side-project
 Gay Blade a 1960s American men's magazine
 GayBlade, an LGBT-themed video game for home computers released in 1992
 The Gay Blade, a 1972 anti-homosexuality tract from Chick Publications